Deoxycorticosterone (DOC), or desoxycorticosterone, may refer to:

 11-Deoxycorticosterone (21-hydroxyprogesterone)
 21-Deoxycorticosterone (11β-hydroxyprogesterone)

See also
 Deoxycortisol
 Deoxycortisone
 11-Hydroxyprogesterone

Pregnanes